Corre is a commune in the Haute-Saône department in the region of Bourgogne-Franche-Comté in eastern France.

Geography
The Côney flows southward through the middle of the commune, crosses the village, then flows into the Saône, which forms most of the commune's south-western border.

See also
Communes of the Haute-Saône department

References

Communes of Haute-Saône